Ammar Rashid (Urdu: عمار رشید; born August 16, 1986) is a Pakistani researcher, academic, political worker and organizer of the left-wing party Awami Workers Party. He has written many columns for  Daily Times (Pakistan) and Dawn News. He has taught as faculty of Centre of excellence for Gender Studies in Quaid-i-Azam University, Islamabad, Pakistan and Pakistan Institute of Development Economics. He ran for the National Assembly seat NA-53 in the Islamabad capital territory for 2018 Pakistani general election. He is senior researcher at Heartfile.

Early life and education
Rashid got his early education from schools in Rawalpindi. He did BSc (Hons) in Economics and Social Sciences in 2008 from Lahore University of Management Sciences and a master's degree in development studies in 2012,  from Institute of Development Studies, University of Sussex, UK. In LUMS, he was student of Aasim Sajjad Akhtar.

Career
Rashid, as a professional has been involved in teaching and research work on areas ranging from health reform to public education, gender and development, public policy, political economy, tax reform, sub-national governance etc. His research interests include political theory and collective action. He also taught at Centre of excellence for Gender Studies department at Quaid-i-Azam University and at the Pakistan Institute of Development Economics (PIDE), Islamabad. He worked as programme officer of Social Sector in National Disaster Management Authority (Pakistan). He is senior researcher at Heartfile. He also worked with Federal Board of Revenue and Alif Ailaan.

Political beginning

Ideology
Rashid follows the political ideology of socialism.

The Emergency Times
Rashid's political struggle started in 2007, when he was a student in LUMS, during Lawyers' Movement, initiated by lawyers of Pakistan against the military dictatorship of Pervez Musharraf. On November 7, 2007, he along with 1,000 students of his university, gathered to protest the emergency rule imposed by Musharraf's televised emergency announcement on November 3, 2007. After his teacher's (Aasim Sajjad Akhtar) arrest, he along with other students was also got arrested during the protest.

Major Pakistani news networks were not allowed to cover the student protest at LUMS, so Rashid took the initiative to start a newsletter named as “The Emergency Times” (November, 2007 - June, 2008) to narrate the protests’ details, to help students speak about democracy and organize against emergency rule. The newsletter described itself as “an independent Pakistani student information initiative providing regular updates, commentary, and analysis on Pakistan’s evolving political scenario.”

Politics

Awami Workers Party
Rashid is a senior and leading member of the Awami Workers Party (AWP) since the party was founded in 2012. He served as general  secretary and information secretary AWP Rawalpindi-Islamabad in 2014–2015.

As political worker of AWP, Rashid has been involved in struggle for the right to affordable housing and shelter in Islamabad in 2015. He organized legal and political resistance to the inhumane and illegal evictions of people from Katchi Abadi (informal settlements) driven by Capital Development Authority (CDA).

While working with All Pakistan Katchi Abadi Alliance, Rashid talked about the flaws in system about rights to housing by people from informal settlements. He said, “Under the Urban Shelter Program the CDA legalized a few slums and left the rest out in the lurch, because the national policy dictated that any slums setup after March 1985 were illegal. We have in our possession voter lists consisting of thousands of people living in the I-11 and other katchi abadis as far back as the 1985 General Election.”

On July 30, 2015, the Capital Development Authority (CDA) along with police, local administration and rangers, demolished dwellings of ‘Katchi Abadi’ (informal settlements) in sector I-11/1, Islamabad destroying dozens of houses built since last 30 years.

On August 2, 2015, to stop these forceful evictions and fight for solution of this urban housing crisis in informal settlements of I-11/1, Rashid along with Aasim Sajjad Akhtar and residents from Kachi Abadi, filed a petition in the Supreme Court for the case on the right to housing.

It was requested in petition that the court declare the residents of katchi abadis of the federal capital entitled to the benefits conferred under Articles 9, 10A and 25 of the Constitution.“It should be declared that the state is bound to provide the residents of katchi abadis shelter and other amenities as per the Constitution and the National Housing Policy 2001.”
On August 26, 2015, the Supreme Court of Pakistan ordered the federal government and other departments to stop further demolishing of houses in katchi abadi  I-11, Islamabad.

In a court filing, CDA claimed it needed to demolish informal settlements as their growing Christian population would threaten the city's Muslim majority. CDA stated: “It seems this pace of occupation of land by Christian community may increase… removal of katchi abadies is very urgent to provide better environment to the citizen of Islamabad and to protect the beauty of Islam.”  Rashid told the newspaper, “The move was old-fashioned bigotry against minorities and working classes. The administrative body has no right to be making decisions about the religious demography of Islamabad.”

Rashid was elected as president of Awami Workers Party Punjab unit in its third congress held on January 17, 2020 in Faisalabad.

On 28 January 2020, Islamabad police arrested Rashid, along with three other members of the Awami Workers Party, Ismat Shahjahan, Nawfal Saleemi and Saifullah Nasar, one member of Progressive Students Federation, PTM leader and member of the National Assembly Mohsin Dawar, and 23 other protesters while they were holding a peaceful protest demanding the release of Pashtun peace activist Manzoor Pashteen, in front of the National Press Club, Islamabad. They were accused of entirely concocted charges of sedition against the state. Ismat Shahjahan and Mohsin Dawar were released on 29 January but the Additional District and Sessions Judge refused to grant post-arrest bail to 23 protesters and sent them to jail. The protesters appealed in the Islamabad High Court where they were granted bail by chief justice Athar Minallah on February 3, 2020. The chief justice Athar Minallah, summoned the Islamabad City Magistrate, asking an explanation for first placing sedition charges on peaceful protesters and later turned them into terrorism charges in the first information report (FIR). On February 17, 2020, Islamabad Deputy Commissioner Hamza Shafqaat told Islamabad High court that all charges against the 23 protesters had been dropped by Islamabad administration. Manzoor Pashteen was also released from jail on 25 February.

As president AWP, Punjab, he supported Aurat Azadi March 2020 held in Islamabad.

General Elections 2018
Rashid contested for the 2018 Pakistani general election on National assembly seat NA-53 in federal capital Islamabad. Out of 312142, he secured 912 votes.

His electoral campaign included the agenda of “social justice, democracy, gender equality, secularism and environmentally sustainable development”. Rashid vowed to revive left-wing politics by bringing back ideological strength to politics.

His election manifesto focused to solve water problem, Rs. 30,000 as minimum wage with continuous increase in proportional to the price hike, allocation of 10% of the total GDP for education and free education to everyone.

During the 2018 election campaign, Rashid along with his party workers, due to security concerns, were not allowed to enter Islamabad with election material, which included relevant banners but he said that Pakistan Tehreek-i-Insaaf (PTI) banners could be seen across Islamabad. According to him, this certainly strengthens the narrative that these elections are engineered and Pakistan cannot afford these allegations at this point."

Student politics
Rashid is strong supporter of potential of country's youth to carry out political struggles and voice their opinion against all odds by thinking and differentiating between the wrong and right and will always continue to stand for the right.

Rashid, on social media expressed solidarity with the campaign organizers of Students Solidarity March, 2018 along with other notable personalities like Iqbal Lala (father of the late Mashal Khan, Bushra Gohar, Jalila Haider, Nida Kirmani, Jibran Nasir, Farooq Tariq. The Charter of Demands presented by students in march included restoring student unions, student representation in decision-making on campuses, functional sexual harassment policies on campuses, freezing the fee hikes, increasing the budgetary allowing for education to 5% of GDP and improving the quality of research and teaching.

On April 13, 2019, Rashid urged students and progressive people to join the Mashal March, to honor Mashal Khan who was killed by his fellow students in university campus on false accusation of blasphemy. Rashid said that the march would call for structural reform of what he described as rotten education system that produced Mashal's killers.

On October 24, 2019, a large number of students, political workers and activists gathered for Student Housing Rights March (Talba Haq-e-Rihayesh March) in Islamabad, protesting against CDA for its forceful eviction of students from private hostels in Islamabad.
The march was organized by Progressive Students Federation (PRSF), Student Hostelites Association (SHA), supported by Awami Workers Party (AWP). Rashid, as an organizer of the march, addressed to the occasion, "the broader crisis in higher education which includes funding cuts for the HEC, fee hikes, endemic and widespread harassment as evident from University of Balochistan’s case and management high handedness, which led to Inam’s death at COMSATS University Islamabad."

On November 29, 2019, Rashid organized and performed in the Students Solidarity March, 2019.

Revolutionary Music
Rashid is also a musician. His music is a mix of acoustic, classical and folk and he regularly performs revolutionary songs and poetry at political events organized by his political party.

On Women's Day, 2015, Rashid, as information Secretary AWP Rawalpindi-Islamabad, performed in the conference arranged for gender equality.

On May 9, 2015, under the banner of Rashid's party, AWP and National Students Federation (NSF), a concert titled as Songs of Freedom-2015 was held at the Aabpara Community Centre, Islamabad to raise awareness of student politics and political rights in city's youth and to make them appreciate revolutionary music and art. As information secretary of AWP Islamabad-Rawalpindi, Rashid played guitar and sang the revolutionary songs: “Hum dekhein gay”, “Aaj bazaar main” along with Kalaam of Khawaja Ghulam Farid and other classical Sufi poets.
 
On May 6, 2016, at the event of Songs of freedom-2016, Rashid played revolutionary songs to lift ban on student unions, to reignite the progressive and democratic spirit among students. and stressed heavily for the right for students to unionise along with other NSF's organisers and performers during the event in Islamabad. Student unions were banned by Gen Ziaul Haq in 1984 in an attempt to suppress expressions of dissent against his dictatorship.

During campaign of 2018 Pakistani general election, Rashid released an official Election Campaign Song along with an explosive music video to boost popularity of AWP among Pakistanis. The song titles as ‘Chehre Nahi Samaaj Ko Badlo’ (Change the society, Not just faces). The powerful lyrics of song demanded people to change themselves in order to bring about an overall change in society. Rashid performed the song with another Pakistani singer and economist Shahram Azhar.

For Aurat Azadi March 2020, Ammar composed the anthem song “Hum Inquilab Hain” (We are Revolution) written by Ismat Shahjahan and sung in chorus with Ismat Shahjahan, Shahzadi Hussain, Huda Bhurgri, Areej Hussain and Ayesha Khan.

Study Circles and Political Schools
Rashid, along with his other party workers helps in organizing political schools and study circles to raise awareness about understanding of social, economic and political structures of inequality and oppression along with  methods of organizing progressive political resistance and ideological strengthening in Pakistani people. The agenda of this initiative is to act like a modern alternative to Pakistan's age-old curriculum, focusing on a radicalized concept of ‘dismantling systems of oppression’, to target the root of issues plaguing society so that, effective solutions can be designed.

On September 2, 2018, the second day of political school, Rashid delivered a lecture on `Capitalism: On the Roots of our Economic Crisis'. He gave a detailed examination of colonialism, industrial capitalism and world economic history, the developments and changes causing decline in feudal mode of production through merchant capitalism.

Articles
Rashid has published and continues to publish regular articles on student politics, development, feminism, political economy, environment etc. in newspapers and magazines (Daily Times (Pakistan), Dawn News, The Express Tribune, The Guardian, Pakistan Today).

References

Living people
Pakistani Marxists
Awami Workers Party politicians
Pakistani socialists
1986 births